Benaouda Hadj Hacène Bachterzi (1894-1958) was an Algerian politician and publicist. He founded and managed the "Es-Sandjak" ("l’Etandard") and "Le cri indigene" newspapers, which focused on the interests of native Algerian Muslims during French colonial rule. Bachterzi was also actively involved in many associations and was elected a Municipal councilor in Oran at the age of twenty-five.

Personal life
Bachterzi was born in Oran into one of the oldest bourgeoisie families of Turkish origin.

References

1894 births
1958 deaths
People from Oran
Algerian people of Turkish descent
Algerian politicians
Algerian journalists
20th-century journalists